Enteromius vanderysti is a species of ray-finned fish in the genus Enteromius which has only been recorded in the Democratic Republic of Congo.

Footnotes 

 

Enteromius
Taxa named by Max Poll
Fish described in 1945
Endemic fauna of the Democratic Republic of the Congo